Vitaliy Sergeyevich Abramov (born 12 July 1974) is a Kazakhstani professional football coach and a former player. He also holds Russian citizenship.

Club career
He made his debut in the Russian Premier League in 1995 for FC Tekstilshchik Kamyshin.

Honours
 Russian Premier League runner-up: 1997.
 Russian Premier League bronze: 1996.
 Ukrainian Premier League champion: 2002.
 Ukrainian Premier League runner-up: 2000, 2001.

European club competitions
With FC Rotor Volgograd.

 1996 UEFA Intertoto Cup: 8 games, 3 goals.
 1997–98 UEFA Cup: 5 games, 1 goal.
 1998–99 UEFA Cup: 2 games, 1 goal.

References

1974 births
People from Karaganda Region
Living people
Russian footballers
Soviet footballers
Kazakhstani footballers
Kazakhstani expatriate footballers
Kazakhstan international footballers
Association football midfielders
FC Tekstilshchik Kamyshin players
FC Rotor Volgograd players
FC Shakhtar Donetsk players
FC Shakhtar-2 Donetsk players
FC Metalurh Donetsk players
FC Elista players
FC Ural Yekaterinburg players
FC Shakhter Karagandy players
FC Volgar Astrakhan players
Expatriate footballers in Russia
Expatriate footballers in Ukraine
Kazakhstani expatriate sportspeople in Ukraine
Russian Premier League players
Ukrainian Premier League players
FC Mordovia Saransk players
FC Avangard Kursk players